Sheila Rodwell OBE (née Harrison; March 7, 1947 – June 16, 2009), known professionally by her first married name Sheila Bingham, was a British nutritional epidemiologist known for conducting detailed studies into clarify the biological mechanisms underlying the effects of different diets on health and disease, especially cancer.

Education
Bingham was educated at Loughborough High School and graduated from Queen Elizabeth College with a BSc in Nutrition in 1968, and 1969 with a Postgraduate Diploma in Dietetics as dietitian. In 1984, she was awarded her PhD from the University of London for her work on the development of biomarkers of nutritional intake.

Career
After having worked as a hospital dietitian, Bingham became a research officer at the MRC Dunn Human Nutrition Unit. She was one of the founding investigators of the European Prospective Investigation into Cancer and Nutrition and the EPIC Norfolk cohort in and around Norwich. She became deputy director of the MRC Dunn Human Nutrition Unit in 1997 and leader of the "Diet and Cancer" group. In 2006, she became director of the new MRC Centre for Nutritional Epidemiology in Cancer Prevention and Survival at the University of Cambridge. She was honorary professor of Nutritional Epidemiology at the University of Cambridge and lifelong fellow at Clare Hall.

Research
Bingham's research concerned the association between diet and disease, and in particular objective methods for the objective assessment of dietary exposure.

Personal life
Bingham married Roger Bingham in 1970; in 2000 she married Simon Rodwell.

References

External links 
  

1947 births
2009 deaths
Officers of the Order of the British Empire
British women epidemiologists
Fellows of Clare College, Cambridge
People associated with Queen Elizabeth College
People from St Albans
People educated at Loughborough High School
20th-century British women scientists